The San Antonio River Walk is a city park and special-case pedestrian street in San Antonio, Texas, one level down from the automobile street. The River Walk winds and loops under bridges as two parallel sidewalks lined with restaurants and shops, connecting the major tourist draws such as the Shops at Rivercenter, the Arneson River Theatre, Marriage Island, La Villita, HemisFair Park, the Tower Life Building, the San Antonio Museum of Art, the Pearl, and the city's five Spanish colonial missions, which have been named a World Heritage Site, which includes the Alamo. During the annual springtime Fiesta San Antonio, the River Parade features flowery floats that float down the river.

The area within the circumference of the River Walk is the heart of the original 1700s Villa de Bejar outpost, which would eventually become the City of San Antonio.

History

In September 1921, a disastrous flood along the San Antonio River took 51 lives, with an additional 23 people reported missing. Plans were then developed for flood control of the river.  Among the plans was to build an upstream dam (Olmos Dam) and bypass a prominent bend of the river in the Downtown area (between present day Houston Street and Villita Parkway), then to pave over the bend, and create a storm sewer.

Work began on the Olmos Dam and bypass channel in 1926; however, the San Antonio Conservation Society successfully protested the paved sewer option.  No major plans came into play until 1929, when San Antonio native and architect Robert Hugman submitted his plans for what would become the River Walk.  Although many have been involved in development of the site, the leadership of former mayor Jack White was instrumental in passage of a bond issue that raised funds to empower the 1938 "San Antonio River Beautification Project", which began the evolution of the site into the present 2.5-mile-long (4 km) River Walk.

Hugman endorsed the bypass channel idea (which would be completed later that year) but, instead of paving over the bend, Hugman suggested 1) a flood gate at the northern (upstream) end of the bend; 2) a small dam at the southern (downstream) end of the bend; and 3) a Tainter gate in the channel to regulate flow.  The bend would then be surrounded by commercial development, which he titled "The Shops of Aragon and Romula".  Hugman went as far as to maintain his architect's office along the bend.

Hugman's plan was initially not well-received – the area was noted for being dangerous. At one point, it was declared off-limits to military personnel. People were warned of the threat of being "drowned like a rat" should the river flood.

Hugman's persistence paid off; he was named project architect. His plan would be put to the test in 1946, when another major flood threatened Downtown San Antonio, but the Olmos Dam and bypass channel minimized the area damage. Casa Rio, a landmark River Walk restaurant, became the first restaurant in the area in 1946, opening next door to Hugman's office.

Through the following decades the network has been improved and extended. The first major extension of the Riverwalk was constructed by the joint venture of two general contractors Darragh & Lyda Inc. and H. A. Lott Inc. to Tower of the Americas as part of HemisFair '68.  The expansion extended the Riverwalk beyond its natural banks at the horseshoe bend to the new convention center and theater by excavating much of the block bordered by Commerce, Bowie, Market and Alamo Streets.  That was also the year the Hilton Palacio del Rio was built, the first of many downtown hotels that leverage their slice of urban "riverfront." A subsequent major expansion opened in 1988 that extended a branch from the 1968 extension to create a lagoon at the new Rivercenter Mall and the Marriott Rivercenter Hotel.

In 1981 the Hyatt Regency San Antonio opened with a new pedestrian connector that linked Alamo Plaza to the River Walk with concrete waterfalls, waterways and indigenous landscaping. Known as the Paseo del Alamo, this river "extension" actually flows from Alamo Plaza into the San Antonio River through the atrium of the hotel.  This connector not only allows the hotel to market itself as being on Alamo Plaza and on the River Walk, but it provides the city with an urban park that connects the city's two largest tourist attractions.

Many downtown buildings like the Casino Club Building have street entrances and separate river entrances one level below. This separates the automotive service grid (for delivery and emergency vehicles) from pedestrian traffic (below) through an intricate network of bridges, walkways, and old staircases. The San Antonio Spurs had their five NBA Championship victory parades/cruises along the river walk.

Growth and expansion

Expansion plans are planned for areas of the river north and south of Downtown.  As chain restaurants and establishments have begun to flourish, now taking up about a third of commercial space, talk has begun at City Hall about limiting their existence on the River Walk and keeping a distinctively local flair. On May 30, 2009, the city opened the $72 million Museum Reach. The Museum Reach features local attractions such as the San Antonio Museum of Art and The Pearl Brewery, which has become one of the most popular areas for locals.

Two years later, in May 2011, the River Walk was extended by several miles to extend from Downtown to Mission Espada which is on the city's south side. This addition (named the "Mission Reach") is notable for its emphasis on ecological controls and improvements, as well as trail improvements to support both hiking and biking. The Mission Reach has paddling trails and biking trails which allow tourists to experience the UNESCO World Heritage Missions.

After years of murmuring from locals and tourists about the water's quality, talk has also begun about cleaning up the water, although the muddy bottom and silt deposits make this difficult.  The muddy bottom does receive an annual cleaning during the Mud Festival.

In early 2016, for the first time in its history, the River Walk was connected with another linear urban walkway, the San Pedro Creek Greenway. The greenway joins with the River Walk at the confluence of the San Pedro Creek and the San Antonio River near Mission Concepción.

On May 25, 2017, Esperanza Andrade, a former Texas secretary of state, and Lisa Wong, her business partner in the company Go Rio San Antonio, prevailed in a 10-1 vote from the San Antonio City Council for the $100 million contract to operate the barges on the River Walk. The only dissenter on the council was the mayoral candidate Ron Nirenberg, who faced Mayor Ivy Taylor in a runoff election on June 10. In selecting Andrade and Wong, the council rejected City Manager Sheryl Sculley's recommendation to award the contract instead to the Chicago-based Entertainment Cruises, the choice also of former Mayor Phil Hardberger. On receiving the contract, Andrade told Taylor and the council: "We not only know but we understand why the River Walk is indeed our crown jewel of our beautiful city. And we understand that the barge operation is the thread that weaves it all together." 

In 2021 it was temporarily used as a source of water after a winter storm crippled infrastructure across Texas.

Impact
The River Walk has inspired similar projects in other cities, such as the Little Sugar Creek Greenway in Charlotte, North Carolina, the Cherry Creek Greenway in Denver, Colorado, the Bricktown Canal in Oklahoma City, Oklahoma, and the Santa Lucía Riverwalk in Monterrey, Mexico.

See also
Fiesta Noche del Rio
 List of restaurant districts and streets in the United States

References

External links

San Antonio River Improvements Projects — Website run by the San Antonio River Authority covering current and future projects along the River Walk
The World Famous San Antonio River Walk — business/tourist online guide
River Walk — San Antonio Convention and Visitors Bureau

Historic American Landscapes Survey in Texas
Pedestrian malls in the United States
Restaurant districts and streets in the United States
River Walk
Transportation in Bexar County, Texas
Works Progress Administration in Texas